German submarine U-370 was a Type VIIC U-boat of Nazi Germany's Kriegsmarine during World War II.

She carried out twelve patrols before being scuttled in northern Germany on 5 May 1945.

She sank two warships.

Design
German Type VIIC submarines were preceded by the shorter Type VIIB submarines. U-370 had a displacement of  when at the surface and  while submerged. She had two shafts and two  propellers.

U-370 was fitted with five  torpedo tubes (four fitted at the bow and one at the stern), fourteen torpedoes, one  SK C/35 naval gun, 220 rounds, and two  C/30 anti-aircraft guns. The boat had a complement of between forty-four and sixty.

Service history
The submarine was laid down on 21 November 1942 at the Flensburger Schiffbau-Gesellschaft yard at Flensburg as yard number 493, launched on 24 September 1943 and commissioned on 19 November under the command of Oberleutnant zur See Karl Nielsen.

She served with the 4th U-boat Flotilla from 19 November 1943, the 8th flotilla from 1 August 1944 and was back with the 4th flotilla on 16 February 1945.

U-370 spent her entire career in the relatively confined waters of the Baltic Sea and the Gulf of Finland.

First to fifth patrols
The boat's first patrol was preceded by trips from Kiel to Marviken and then back to Kiel, from where she departed on 9 July 1944. She sailed through the Baltic and into the Gulf of Finland, arriving at Reval, (now Tallinn in Estonia), on 12 July.

She spent the rest of her career in the Ostsee, sinking the Soviet Patrol boat MO-101 in Björkö Sound on 31 July 1944 during her fifth patrol.

Sixth to twelfth patrols
During her ninth sortie Matrosengefreiter Erwin Stiegeler was swept overboard in the Baltic on 23 September 1944.

Fate
U-370 was scuttled in Geltinger Bucht (east of Flensburg) on 5 May 1945. The wreck was broken up in 1948.

Summary of raiding history

References

Notes

Citations

Bibliography

External links

German Type VIIC submarines
U-boats commissioned in 1943
1943 ships
Ships built in Flensburg
World War II submarines of Germany
Operation Regenbogen (U-boat)
Maritime incidents in May 1945